A water spot is an area of dried mineral deposits left on a surface after being allowed to air dry.  

Water quality, specifically the amount and type of minerals in the local water supply as measured by the total suspended solids or TSS test and other mineral levels such as sodium level, has a significant effect on how severe water spots can be, for example on an automobile or dishes.

Prevention
Water spots can be avoided by drying after washing using a "shammy" cloth or towel for a car and a good drying cycle in a dishwasher, or by manual drying or good drainage after manually washing dishes.

For permeable materials, such as a drywall ceiling, water spots or stains are permanent indicators of water damage and previous leaks.

See also
Auto detailing
Wikibooks:Car washing techniques

External links
Water Damage Restoration

Water